Fatima Jinnah Women University or FJWU is a public university in the neighborhood of Mall Road of Rawalpindi, Punjab, Pakistan.

Recognized university
Regarded as the first women's university in Pakistan, it is ranked at number 18 in general category of the Higher Education Commission of Pakistan rankings. Dr. Najma Najam, a neuroscientist, was the  founding Vice-Chancellor of this institution.

Students come from all over the country from as far as Balochistan, Southern Punjab, Gilgit-Baltistan, Khyber Pakhtunkhwa and Sindh.

Campuses
The main building is Victorian, built as a residence by Sikh brothers Mohan and Sohan Singh. It became the Presidency of Pakistan around the mid-1960s. The rooms are steeped in history; personalities like Benazir Bhutto,  Fazal Ilahi Chaudhry and President Habibullah Khan Marwat, President General Zia Ul-Haq have walked the corridors. Former Prime Minister Mian Muhammad Nawaz Sharif inaugurated it as a gift for the nation's daughters and their families on 6 August 1998.

Academic departments

Arts and Humanities
Anthropology
Sociology
Urdu
English
Fine Arts
Education
Islamic Studies
Gender Studies

Business and Social Sciences
Behavioral Sciences
Business Administration
Communication and Media Studies
Commerce
Economics
Computer Arts
Computer Science
Chemistry
Defence and Diplomatic Studies
Public Administration

Engineering
Electronic Engineering
Environmental Sciences
Software Engineering

Science and Technology
Mathematical Sciences
Physics
Chemistry
Computer Science

Degree programs

Professional Degree Programs
Law
Computer Arts
Software Engineering
Psychology

Undergraduate programs
Anthropology
Sociology
Economics
Islamic Studies
Behavioral Sciences
Public Administration
Communication and Media Studies
Gender Studies
Computer Science
Chemistry
Fine Arts
Education
Business Administration
Environmental Sciences
Defence and Diplomatic Studies
Urdu
Software Engineering
Physics
Law
Commerce
Electronic Engineering
Computer Arts
Mathematical Sciences

Research Degree Programs
Anthropology
Sociology
Behavioral Sciences
Economics
Education
English language and Literature
Environmental Sciences
Computer Science
Gender Studies

Women Research and Resource Center
The Women Research and Resource Centre researches gender and social issues to reflect the academic and professional development of women in general and in the context of Pakistan's society in particular.

FM Radio Services
Fatima Jinnah is host to an FM radio channel that is broadcast during university hours and operated in the department of Mass Communications.

References

External links
FJWU website
Quality Enhancement Cell
Jobs
Oric
Journal of gender  
Journal of education

F
Women's universities and colleges in Pakistan
Educational institutions established in 1998
1998 establishments in Pakistan
Universities and colleges in Rawalpindi District